= Arawalli =

- Village
- Country: India
- State: Karnataka
- District: Belgaum

Languages
  - Official: Kannada
- Time zone: UTC+5:30 (IST)
- ISO 3166 code: IN-KA

Arawalli is a village in Belgaum district in the southern state of Karnataka, India.

== Demographics ==
There are a total of 200 families residing in the Village. According to the 2011 Census, its population is 1,011 of which 510 are males while 501 are females.
